
Sons of Liberty were a secret organization of patriots during America's Colonial period.

Sons of Liberty may also refer to:

Organisations

 Société des Fils de la Liberté (Society of the Sons of Liberty), secret revolutionary organisation involved in the Lower Canada Rebellion of 1837-1838
 Knights of the Golden Circle, reorganised in 1865 as the Order of the Sons of Liberty

In film and television

Sons of Liberty (film), a 1939 Academy Award-winning film
Sons of Liberty (miniseries), a three-part mini-series airing on the History channel

In video games

Metal Gear Solid 2: Sons of Liberty, a 2001 Japanese video game

In music

Sons of Liberty (band), a solo-project of Jon Schaffer of Iced Earth
"Sons of Liberty", a Frank Turner song from his 2009 album Poetry of the Deed

ru:Сыны свободы (значения)